Kiama lachrymoides is a species of spiders in the family  Microstigmatidae. It was first described in 1969 by Main and Mascord. , it is the sole species in the genus Kiama. It is found in New South Wales.

References

Microstigmatidae
Spiders of Australia
Spiders described in 1969